Charles Pollock may refer to:
Charles Pollock (1902–1988), American abstract painter and brother of Jackson Pollock
Charles Pollock (designer) (1930–2013), industrial designer
Charles Edward Pollock (1823–1897), English judge